Family Law is an American legal drama television series, created by Paul Haggis, that aired on CBS from September 20, 1999, to May 27, 2002. This series starring Kathleen Quinlan as divorced lawyer Lynn Holt, who attempted to start her own law firm after her husband left both her and their law practice, taking all of their clients with him.

The show also starred Christopher McDonald as opportunistic, ambulance-chasing attorney Rex Weller, Julie Warner as Lynn's friend Danni (and the one member of her former firm's staff who did not defect with Lynn's ex-husband), and Dixie Carter as "pit bull" divorce attorney Randi King. Later cast additions included Tony Danza, Cristián de la Fuente, Salli Richardson, and Meredith Eaton as Emily Resnick, an ambitious attorney hoping to make partner.

Edwin Starr's 1970 hit song, "War" was used as the series' opening title theme, in seasons one and three. A cover version of the song was performed by The Brink and used in season two.

Cast
 Kathleen Quinlan as Lynn Holt 
 Julie Warner as Danni Lipton (seasons 1–2)
 Christopher McDonald as Rex Weller 
 Dixie Carter as Randi King
 Cristián de la Fuente as Andres Diaz (seasons 1–2)
 Salli Richardson as Viveca Foster
 Merrilee McCommas as Patricia Dumar
 Michelle Horn as Cassie Holt
 David Dorfman as Rupert Holt
 Tony Danza as Joe Celano (seasons 2–3)
 Orla Brady as Naoise O'Neill (season 2–3)
 Meredith Eaton as Emily Resnick (season 3)

 Notes

Episodes

Season 1 (1999–2000)

Season 2 (2000–2001)

Season 3 (2001–2002)

Release and syndication
Since fall 2018, the show has been syndicated on the channel Start TV.

Reception
Ron Wertheimer of the New York Times wrote: "Ms. Quinlan is most appealing, but this series can't survive on her determination alone." Tom Shales of The Washington Post gave it a positive review, "Quinlan is admirable and believable as a woman who won't let setbacks set her back; she's easy to root for." 

On Rotten Tomatoes, season one has an approval rating of 10% based on reviews from 10 critics. The site's consensus is "Although Kathleen Quinlan gives a commendable performance, Family Law fizzles out with its bizarre tonal shifts, two-dimensional characterizations, and unbelievable storylines."

References

External links
 

CBS original programming
1999 American television series debuts
1990s American drama television series
2000s American drama television series
2002 American television series endings
Television series created by Paul Haggis
Television series by CBS Studios
1990s American legal television series
2000s American legal television series
Television series by Sony Pictures Television